Spurn is a narrow sand tidal island located off the tip of the coast of the East Riding of Yorkshire, England that reaches into the North Sea and forms the north bank of the mouth of the Humber Estuary. It was a spit with a semi-permanent connection to the mainland, but a storm in 2013 made the road down to the end of Spurn impassable to vehicles at high tide.

The southernmost tip is known as Spurn Head or Spurn Point and is the home to an RNLI lifeboat station and two disused lighthouses. It forms part of the civil parish of Easington.

It has been owned since 1960 by the Yorkshire Wildlife Trust and is a designated national nature reserve, heritage coast and is part of the Humber Flats, Marshes and Coast Special Protection Area.

History 

Spurn Head was known to classical authors, such as Ptolemy as Ocelum Promontorium. In the Middle Ages, Spurn Head was home to the port of Ravenspurn (a.k.a. Ravenspur or Ravensburgh), where Henry of Bolingbroke landed in 1399 on his return to dethrone Richard II. It was also where Sir Martin de la See led the local resistance against Edward IV's landing on 14 March 1471, as he was returning from his six months' exile in the Netherlands. An earlier village, closer to the point of Spurn Head, was Ravenser Odd. Along with many other villages on the Holderness coast, Ravenspurn and Ravenser Odd were lost to the encroachments of the sea, as Spurn Head, due to erosion and deposition of its sand, migrated westward.

The lifeboat station at Spurn Head was built in 1810. Owing to the remote location, houses for the lifeboat crew and their families were added a few years later. By the 1870s a room in the high lighthouse was being used as a chapel for the small residential community on Spurn Head, serving 'the keepers, coast-guardsmen and fishermen who live at the Point'.

During the First World War two coastal artillery  batteries were added at either end of Spurn Head, with  quick-firing guns in between. The emplacements can be clearly seen, and the northern ones are particularly interesting as coastal erosion has partly toppled them onto the beach, revealing the size of the concrete foundations very well.

As well as a road, the peninsula also used to have a railway, parts of which can still be seen. Unusual 'sail bogies' were used as well as more conventional light railway equipment.

Following a tidal surge in December 2013 the roadway became unsafe, and access to Spurn Point is on foot only, with a warning not to attempt this when exceptionally high tides are due. Spurn has now become a tidal island, as the narrowest part of the sandbank connection to the mainland is flooded with each high tide.

Plans to build a new visitor centre for the reserve were unveiled in September 2014 by Yorkshire Wildlife Trust (YWT). Planning consent for the initial plans was refused by East Riding of Yorkshire Council in July 2016 but revised plans were approved in January 2017. These plans face local opposition because of the perceived feeling of commercialisation of the reserve by YWT, with plans to build extensive car park facilities, no longer free. The new visitor centre was officially opened by Simon King on 20 March 2018.

Geography

The spit is made up from sand, shingle and boulder clay eroded from the Holderness coastline washed down the coastline from Flamborough Head. Material is washed down the coast by longshore drift and accumulates to form the long, narrow embankment in the sheltered waters inside the mouth of the Humber Estuary. It is maintained by plants, especially marram grass (Ammophila arenaria). Waves carry material along the peninsula to the tip, continually extending it; as this action stretches the peninsula it also narrows it to the extent that the sea can cut across it in severe weather. When the sea cuts across it permanently, everything beyond the breach is swept away, only to eventually reform as a new spit pointing further south. This cycle of destruction and reconstruction occurs approximately every 250 years. More recently, Dr. John Pethick of Hull University put forward a different theory to explain the formation of Spurn Head. He suggests that the spit head has been a permanent feature since the end of the last ice age, having developed on an underwater glacial moraine. As the ice sheets melted, sea level gradually rose and longshore drift caused a spit to form between this and other islands along the moraine. Under normal circumstances, the sea washes over the neck of the spit taking sand from the seaward side and redepositing it on the landward side. Over time, the whole spit, length intact, slips back – with the spit-head remaining on its glacial foundation. This process has now been affected by the protection of the spit put in place during the Victorian era. This protection halted the wash-over process and resulted in the spit being even more exposed due to the rest of the coast moving back  since the 'protection' was constructed.

The second of the Six Studies in English Folk Song composed in 1926 by Ralph Vaughan Williams, the Andante sostenuto in E flat "Spurn Point" celebrates this peninsula.

It was featured on the television programme Seven Natural Wonders as one of the wonders of Yorkshire.

Ecology
The landward-side mud flats are an important feeding ground for wading birds, and the area has a bird observatory, for monitoring migrating birds and providing accommodation to visiting birdwatchers. Their migration is assisted by east winds in autumn, resulting in drift migration of Scandinavian migrants, sometimes leading to a spectacular "fall" of thousands of birds. Many uncommon species have been sighted there, including a cliff swallow from North America, a lanceolated warbler from Siberia and a black-browed albatross from the Southern Ocean. More commonly, birds such as northern wheatears, whinchats, common redstarts and flycatchers alight at Spurn on their way between breeding and wintering grounds elsewhere. When the wind is in the right direction migrants are funnelled down Spurn Point and are counted at the Narrows Watchpoint, more than 15,000 birds can fly past on a good morning in autumn with 3,000 quite normal.

Lighthouses

The earliest reference to a lighthouse on Spurn Point is 1427. From the 17th century there are records of a pair of lighthouses being maintained as leading lights: a high light and a low light.

Old High and Low Lights

In 1767, John Smeaton was commissioned to build a new pair of lighthouses. Smeaton's high light (a  tower) remained in use until 1895, but there were problems (as there had been in previous years) with maintaining the low light; within a short time it had been washed away by the sea. A series of more-or-less temporary replacements were used in the years that followed, until a more solid lighthouse designed by James Walker was constructed in 1852 under the supervision of engineer Henry Norris. Unlike its predecessor this low light was built the estuary side (i.e. to the west) of the high light, rather than on the seaward side.

Initially both lighthouses were coal-fired. In 1819 Smeaton's high light was equipped with 24 Argand lamps and reflectors); later, in 1853, it was fitted with a new Fresnel lens: a large (first-order) fixed optic by Henry Lepaute of Paris. (Prior to installation this lens had been exhibited at the Great Exhibition of 1851). Later, a red sector was added to the high light, which warned ships of hazards to the south ranging from Clee Ness to Sand Haile Flats.

The low light, meanwhile, had also been fitted with oil lamps and reflectors in 1816. Then, in 1848, a small Fresnel lens (a fifth-order lenticular dioptric) had been installed, which was reused when the new tower was built in 1852.

In 1895 both this low light and Smeaton's high light were decommissioned and replaced by a single lighthouse which still stands on the grass of Spurn Head. The 1852 low light also still stands on the sandy shore of the island, though its lantern has been replaced by a large water tank. (Of the old Smeaton high light only the foundations remain; after dismantling, its optic was re-used in the high lighthouse at Nash Point, where it was installed as part of a programme of improvements.)

The new Spurn Lighthouse
It was designed by Thomas Matthews. In addition there were separate sector lights, two of which marked particular shoals or sandbanks, while another indicated the main channel along the Humber. Initially oil-lit, the lighthouse was converted to electricity in 1941 to enable the light to be lit briefly (as and when requested by allied ships and convoys) and then extinguished.

Then, in 1957, the lighthouse was converted to acetylene gas operation. A new, smaller, gas-driven revolving optic was installed, which flashed once every fifteen seconds; and the subsidiary lights were provided with occulting mechanisms, also gas-driven. The new systems were automated; the keepers therefore moved out and their cottages were demolished.

Decommissioning
Due to improvements in navigation, the light was discontinued in 1985. The main optic was removed the following year; (the combined acetylene lamp and gas-powered optic were subsequently put on display, first in the Trinity House National Lighthouse Museum, then in the National Maritime Museum Cornwall). Since then, the lighthouse has remained empty.

Restoration
In 2013, however, Yorkshire Wildlife Trust was awarded a £470,500 grant to restore the lighthouse with a view to its being reopened as a visitor centre. This was scheduled to take place in 2015, with work starting in April 2015. The work was completed in March 2016, and opened to the public for the Easter weekend.

Gallery

See also

 Humber Forts
 Spurn Lightship
 Spurn Point Military Railway

References

Further reading

External links

 Yorkshire Wildlife Trust – Spurn Nature Reserve
 Spurn Head Heritage Coast
 Spurn Point – National Nature Reserve and Lifeboat Station
 Spurn Bird Observatory
 Tide times at Spurn Point from the UKHO

National nature reserves in England
Special Protection Areas in England
Holderness
Islands of the Humber
Humber
Nature reserves in the East Riding of Yorkshire
Yorkshire Wildlife Trust reserves
Bird observatories in England
Yorkshire coast
Spits of England